Calocosmus dimidiatus is a species of beetle in the family Cerambycidae. It was described by Chevrolat in 1838. It is known from Cuba.

References

Calocosmus
Beetles described in 1838
Endemic fauna of Cuba